Vidette is a city in Burke County, Georgia, United States. The population was 112 at the 2010 census. It is part of the Augusta, Georgia metropolitan area.

History
The Georgia General Assembly incorporated Vidette as a town in 1908. The town has the name of one Dr. Vidette.

Geography

Demographics

As of the 2010 United States Census, there were 112 people living in the city. The racial makeup of the city was 67.0% White, 27.7% Black, 1.8% Native American and 2.7% from two or more races. 0.9% were Hispanic or Latino of any race.

As of the census of 2000, there were 112 people, 41 households, and 28 families living in the city. The racial makeup of the city was 56.25% White, 35.71% African American, 5.36% from other races, and 2.68% from two or more races. Hispanic or Latino of any race were 5.36% of the population.

There were 41 households, out of which 26.8% had children under the age of 18 living with them, 51.2% were married couples living together, 14.6% had a female householder with no husband present, and 31.7% were non-families. 31.7% of all households were made up of individuals, and 22.0% had someone living alone who was 65 years of age or older. The average household size was 2.73 and the average family size was 3.50.

In the city, the population was spread out, with 33.0% under the age of 18, 4.5% from 18 to 24, 26.8% from 25 to 44, 18.8% from 45 to 64, and 17.0% who were 65 years of age or older. The median age was 39 years. For every 100 females, there were 83.6 males. For every 100 females age 18 and over, there were 74.4 males.

The median income for a household in the city was $11,500, and the median income for a family was $15,000. Males had a median income of $70,625 versus $26,250 for females. The per capita income for the city was $13,231. There were 36.1% of families and 45.5% of the population living below the poverty line, including 88.9% of under eighteens and 21.7% of those over 64.

See also

Central Savannah River Area

References

Cities in Georgia (U.S. state)
Cities in Burke County, Georgia
Augusta metropolitan area